Bharthavu is a 1964 Indian Malayalam film, directed by M. Krishnan Nair and produced by T. E. Vasudevan. The film stars Sheela, Kaviyoor Ponnamma, Ramesh and T. S. Muthaiah in the lead roles. The film had musical score by V. Dakshinamoorthy and M. S. Baburaj.

Cast
 
Sheela 
Kaviyoor Ponnamma 
Ramesh
T. S. Muthaiah 
Prathapachandran 
Adoor Pankajam 
Baby Vinodini 
Bahadoor 
Chandran
K. B. Kurup
P. A. Krishnan 
Simhalan 
T. K. Balachandran 
Vijayakumar
Alex

Soundtrack
The music was composed by V. Dakshinamoorthy and M. S. Baburaj and the lyrics were written by P. Bhaskaran.

References

External links
 

1964 films
1960s Malayalam-language films
Films directed by M. Krishnan Nair